Madhavrao I (February 15, 1745 – November 18, 1772) was the 9th Peshwa of the Maratha Empire. During his tenure, the Maratha empire fully recovered from the losses they suffered during the Third Battle of Panipat, a phenomenon known as Maratha Resurrection.

Early life and ascendancy to Peshwa

Madhavrao Bhat was second son of Peshwa Nanasaheb, son of Bajirao. He was born in Savnur in 1745. At the time of his birth, the Maratha Empire was stretched across a sizeable portion of Western, Central and Northern India. On December 9, 1758, Madhavrao married Ramabai in Pune.

Nanasaheb had greatly expanded the Maratha Empire and had tried to establish better governance. However, he was held partially responsible for the severe defeat of the Marathas by Ahmad Shah Abdali at the Third Battle of Panipat in early 1761. The Maratha forces suffered heavy losses including Nanasaheb's eldest son and heir Vishwasrao Bhat and cousin Sadashivrao Bhau.  He died  on June 23, 1761 at Parvati Hill in Pune.

After his father's death, the sixteen-year-old Madhav Rao was made the next Peshwa of Maratha Empire.  His paternal uncle Raghunathrao was to act as regent.

Early reign

At the ascendancy of Madhavrao, the Maratha empire was in complete shambles as their defeat at Panipat had accumulated big debts to their wealth. At Shaniwar Wada, the prime residence of the Peshwa, religious rituals and ceremonies were frequently being conducted. The discipline required for the smooth running of administrative affairs was almost non-existent. The security at the treasury was poor. When these weaknesses were brought to Madhavrao's notice, he introduced changes by personally looking into the administration, accounts and the treasury. He also reduced the religious practices being followed at Shaniwar Wada.

In February 1762, Peshwas set out to conquer Karnataka. This was one of the earliest wars against the Nizam when conflict arose between Madhavrao and his uncle Raghunathrao. Due to difference of opinion between the two, Raghunathrao decided to abandon the troop midway and return to Pune, while Madhavrao continued. Eventually, a treaty was signed with the Nizam and Madhavrao returned. Both Madhavrao and Raghunathrao had their preferences even over the Sardars (Generals). Madhavrao usually preferred the company of Gopalrao Patwardhan, Tryambakrao Mama Pethe, Nana Fadnavis and Ramshastri Prabhune; while Raghunathrao was dearer to Sakharam Bapu Bokil, Gulabrao and Gangoba Tatya.

Disputes with Ragunathrao

The discord between Madhavrao and Raghunathrao was increasing and on August 22, 1762, Raghunathrao fled to Vadgaon Maval where he started grooming his own army.Raghunathrao's men started looting the nearby villages for warfare and this act angered Madhavrao. He decided to wage a war against his uncle Raghunathrao on November 7, 1762. However, Madhavrao didn't wish to battle against his own uncle and thus, proposed for a treaty. Raghunathrao agreed to sign the treaty with Madhavrao and asked him to move back to a non-attacking position. Madhavrao did so. However, Raghunathrao deceived Madhavrao. When the Maratha camp under Madhavrao was relaxed and unsuspecting of a battle, they were caught unawared as Raghunathrao attacked treacherously. Thus, Madhavrao was defeated in the Battle of Alegaon and on November 12, 1762 surrendered himself to Raghunathrao near Alegaon. After the surrender, Raghunathrao decided to control all the major decisions under the assistance of Sakharam Bapu. He also decided to befriend Nizam, but this proved to be a wrong masterplan as the Nizam slowly started infiltrating the zones of Maratha Empire. As time slipped by, Madhavrao pointed out the gravity of the situation to his uncle. Eventually on March 7, 1763 the Peshwas, once again under Madhavrao's leadership, decided to attack Aurangabad to crush Nizam. After months of chasing, Peshwas faced Nizam's army on August 10, 1763 in the Battle of Rakshasbhuvan near Aurangabad. Nizam's army suffered huge losses in this war and Nizam retreated.

War against Hyder Ali and Mysore

In January 1764, for the second time, Madhavrao decided to gather up his defences and conquer Hyder Ali. This time his massive army included efficient generals like Gopalrao Patwardhan, Murarrao Ghorpade, Vinchurkar and Naro Shankar. Raghunathrao declined his offer to join him and instead chose to visit Nashik. This was a particularly long conquest which went for almost a year in and around the districts of Karnataka. However, Hyder Ali somehow managed to escape the clutches of the Peshwas. Eventually, Madhavrao decided to call Raghunathrao for his assistance, but Raghunathrao only signed a treaty with Hyder Ali, much to Madhavrao's disappointment. Raghunathrao intentionally made this move, since he was now fearfully aware of Madhavrao's burgeoning power. Additionally, his loyal assistant Sakharam bapu also warned him against the consequences of conquering Hyder Ali. Peshwa's failure to impose authority over Hyder Ali triggered a major setback on Madhavrao's health. In 1767, Madhavrao I organized a 3rd expedition against Hyder Ali and inflicted defeats on Hyder Ali in the battles of Sira and Madhugiri and made a surprise discovery of Queen Virammaji the last ruler of the Keladi Nayaka Kingdom and her son who were kept in confinement in the fort of Madhugiri by Hyder Ali. They were rescued by Madhavrao I and were sent to Pune for protection.

Alliance with Nizam

Peshwas were expanding their territory in the northern regions of India. Raghunathrao, Holkars and Shindes together marched towards Delhi with the intention of expanding the Maratha Empire in these territories. In the meanwhile, Madhavrao made a bold decision of bonding with his old rival, Nizam Ali Khan, Asaf Jah II. The Nizam also genuinely expressed his desire to increase the relationship and thus the two met at Kurumkhed on February 5, 1766. The next few days saw some cultural exchanges and open expressions of concern. The levels of mutual understanding alleviated and this relationship started growing stronger.

Relations with the East India Company 

On December 3, 1767, an East India Company officer named Mastin arrived in Pune. Mastin wanted to establish a military presence in the regions of Vasai and Sashthi, but was confronted by a Madhavrao suspicious of his intentions. Mastin's repeated requests to acquire these regions in return for defeating Hyder Ali fell on deaf ears, and Madhavrao never agreed to them.

Raghunathrao faces house arrest

Though Raghunathrao had marched to the north for expanding the empire, he failed to do so. Instead, he came back to Anandvalli and was again tempted to form an alliance with his generals and fight against Madhavrao. This time, however; Madhavrao was extremely agitated with his uncle's repeated attempts to overthrow him. On June 10, 1768 he waged a war against Raghunathrao, captured him and put him under house arrest at Shaniwar Wada along with his assistant Sakharam Bapu Bokil.

Assassination attempt

The incident occurred on the evening of September 7, 1769. Madhavrao was returning from the Parvati temple at Pune with his comrades, when one of his generals Ramsingh suddenly attacked him with a sword. Madhavrao was warned just in the nick of time and he suffered a blow from the sword on his shoulder as he tried to dodge Ramsingh. Madhavrao believed that this was Raguhnathrao's attempt to murder him, but he imprisoned General Ramsingh.

Death

In June 1770, Peshwas set out to conquer Hyder Ali for the third time. However, Madhavrao was infected with tuberculosis which started deteriorating his health. Tuberculosis was also termed as “Raj-Yakshma” or the prince of diseases. Madhavrao had to return from Miraj as the effects of the disease had started becoming prominent. He was even recommended an English doctor for treatment of the terrible disease and he would follow the advice given by the doctor. However, there were no signs of improvement and slowly it started developing further. The disease had affected his intestine. There was no cure for tuberculosis in those times. Madhavrao decided to spend his last days in his favourite Ganesha Chintamani Temple, Theur.

On 6 October 1772, Raghunathrao tried to escape from the house arrest at Shaniwar Wada, but he was caught again. Madhavrao had become excessively weak, and he could no longer bear such incidents. He had constructed a garden, a wooden hall and a fountain outside this favourite temple.

18 November 1772, early morning approximately at eight: Madhavrao died at the temple premises of Chintamani, Theur. Thousands of citizens visited the site and paid their last respects. Madhavrao was cremated on the banks of the river which was about half a mile from the temple. A small memorial carved out of stone rests today at that place as a memorial.

His wife Ramabai chose to commit sati with his body at the time of cremation .

Character

During this time, an interesting incident occurred. Madhavrao was busy managing the treasury of the kingdom and supervising the calculation of the expenses encountered during the war. One day, he noticed a large crowd anxiously waiting at the entrance of Shaniwar Wada. Upon summoning the guards, he discovered that they were the aggrievated citizens of Pune who had lost their families, house, land and wealth in the war. They had been visiting his residence for the past few days with hopes of expressing their unbearable losses. However, the guards had not allowed them to meet the Peshwa by excusing that his health had deteriorated. When he heard this, Madhavrao became furious with the guards; he immediately left all his tasks aside and stepped out of Shaniwar Wada. He personally met with the poverished families and patiently listened to each one of them. He made a note of every family's loss and personally saw to it that these losses were compensated from the empire's revenue. This speaks volumes about why the citizens always looked up to him with tremendous faith and respect.

Though there were rifts between him and his uncle Raghunathrao, Madhavrao always displayed concern for him on personal grounds. Madhavrao fined his own uncle, his mother's brother, Rastemama for allowing Nizam's men to plunder Pune while his own house was spared. Rastemama complained to his sister and Gopikabai urged Madhavrao to reconsider the fine, he simply refused and did not budge even when she threatened to move out of Shaniwarwada. Gopikabai decided to live separately in Gangapur near Nashik, the two always shared frequent written communication. He had great respect, love and regard for his mother, which is visible in the letters exchanged between the two.

Madhavrao was one of the most able administrators; he brought radical revolutions in the Maratha Empire in terms of efficiency and honesty. Corrupt and lethargic officials were flogged in the courtyard; this brought about the much required discipline in the administration. The judicial system was impartial and faithfully managed by Ram Shastri, who was considered as the supreme pillar of justice. The usage of revenues was maximized for the welfare of the citizens. Artillery and weapons were constantly upgraded and the strength of the empire was maintained at high standards.

Madhavrao was feared by his own servants, but he was approachable to the common man. He was always aware and made others in his fold realize that he is not the king. Justice Kashinath Trimbak Telang citing James Grant Duff narrates an amusing story that illustrates Madhavrao's ruthlessness, omniscience and disregard for religious restrictions.

Legacy

Assessing the impact of the loss of Madhavrao, the writer James Grant Duff eulogised:
 "And the plains of Panipat were not more fatal to the Maratha Empire than the early end of this excellent prince…"

In popular culture
 In the 1987 Marathi TV series Swami, Madhavrao's character was portrayed by Ravindra Mannkani.
 In the 1994 Hindi TV series The Great Maratha, Madhavrao's character was portrayed by Rahul Awasthee.
 Alok Rajwade portrayed Madhavrao in the 2014 Indian Marathi-language historical drama, Rama Madhav
 Chinmay Patwardhan plays Madhavrao in the Indian Marathi-language television serial Swamini which airs on Colors Marathi.
Swami, a Marathi book written by Ranjit Desai on the life of Madhavrao.
 "श्रीमंत माधवराव पेशवा: व्यक्ति आणि कार्य" A Marathi Political biography written by historians Guruprasad Kanitkar and Parag Pimpalkhare.

References 

 Ranjit Desai, Swami (26th Edition March 2007, published by Mehta Publishers, Marathi Literature).
 Govind Sakharam Sardesai, A New History of Marathas
   James Grant Duff, History of the Marathas London,  Longman, Rees, Orme, Brown, and Green (1826)
 Maharashtra Times, माधवराव पेशव्यांचे चित्र आले उजेडात
श्रीमंत माधवराव पेशवा:व्यक्ति आणि कार्य, लेखक: गुरुप्रसाद कानिटकर, पराग पिंपळखरे

Further reading 
 Ranjit Desai, Swami , a historical novel

See also
 Mahadaji Pant Guruji
 Maratha Peshwa and Generals from Bhat Family
 Maratha emperors

Peshwa dynasty
People of the Maratha Empire
Marathi people
18th-century Indian monarchs
Indian Hindus
1745 births
1772 deaths